Phyllis St. Felix Thaxter (November 20, 1919 – August 14, 2012) was an American actress. She is best known for portraying Ellen Lawson in Thirty Seconds Over Tokyo (1944) and Martha Kent in Superman (1978). She also appeared  in Bewitched (1945), 
Blood on the Moon (1948), and The World of Henry Orient (1964).

Early life 
Thaxter was born in Portland, Maine, one of three children of Phyllis ( Schuyler) Thaxter, a former actress, and Sidney St. Felix Thaxter, who later served as a Justice of the Maine Supreme Court. 

Phyllis Thaxter's siblings were Sidney Thaxter and Hildegarde Schuyler Thaxter Niss Gignoux.

Her grandfather was Major Sidney W. Thaxter, who was awarded the Medal of Honor for heroism during the American Civil War.

Career
Before appearing in movies, Thaxter  was on the stage. When Dorothy McGuire went to Hollywood, Thaxter replaced her in the Broadway play Claudia. In 1944, she signed a contract with Metro-Goldwyn-Mayer. Her movie debut was opposite Van Johnson in the 1944 wartime film Thirty Seconds Over Tokyo. In the 1945 film-noir Bewitched, Thaxter played Joan Alris Ellis, a woman suffering from split personality. In 1948, she played a cattle owner's daughter in Blood on the Moon.

At MGM, she routinely portrayed the ever-patient wife to a number of leading men. She moved to Warner Brothers in the 1950s, but usually played the same type of roles. Her career stalled after an attack of polio in 1952. She made a comeback in television series such as Rawhide, portraying Pauline Cushman in the episode "The Blue Spy" (1961), Wagon Train ("The Christine Elliott Story" and "The Vivian Carter Story "), The Twilight Zone ("Young Man's Fancy"), and Alfred Hitchcock Presents. 

She returned to Broadway, appearing in Take Her, She's Mine at the Biltmore in 1961. 

In 1978, Thaxter was cast with Glenn Ford as Jonathan and Martha Kent in the blockbuster film Superman. The film was produced by her daughter Skye Aubrey's husband Ilya Salkind and father-in-law Alexander Salkind.

Personal life
Patricia Bosworth, in her biography of Montgomery Clift, tells of Thaxter's close relationship with Clift in the early 1940s, writing that they "seemed so close that a great many people assumed they would eventually marry". 

While at MGM, Thaxter married James T. Aubrey Jr., who later became president of CBS-TV and MGM. They divorced in 1962. They had two children: Susan Schuyler "Skye" Aubrey, an actress, and James Watson Aubrey. In 1962, Thaxter married Gilbert Lea. They were married for 46 years until his death on May 4, 2008.

A Republican, she supported the campaign of Dwight Eisenhower in the 1952 presidential election.

Death
Thaxter died on August 14, 2012 aged 92, in Longwood, Florida after an eight-year battle with Alzheimer's disease.  

In keeping with her wishes, she was cremated, and her ashes were scattered at sea. Her name was added to her husband's tombstone (as a cenotaph) at Saint Mary the Virgin Cemetery in Falmouth, Maine, where she had lived for many years.

Filmography

Film

Selected television appearances

Radio appearances

References

External links

 
 
 

American film actresses
American stage actresses
American television actresses
1919 births
2012 deaths
People with polio
Actresses from Portland, Maine
Deaths from Alzheimer's disease
Deaths from dementia in Florida
20th-century American actresses
Metro-Goldwyn-Mayer contract players
Schuyler family
American people of Dutch descent
Maine Republicans
California Republicans
Florida Republicans
American Roman Catholics